The Book of Daniel is an American drama television series that was broadcast on NBC. The network promoted it as a serious drama about Christians and the Christian faith, but it was controversial with some Christians. The show had been proposed for NBC's 2005 fall line-up, but was rescheduled as a 2006 mid-season replacement. The program premiered on January 6, 2006, in the US and was scheduled to air in thirteen episodes on Friday nights. The series ended on January 20, 2006. NBC called the show "edgy", "challenging", and "courageous" in its promotional material. On January 24, 2006, a spokeswoman for NBC announced the show had been dropped.

Synopsis
Set in the fictional town of Newbury in Westchester County, New York, the main character is the Reverend Daniel Webster (Aidan Quinn), an unconventional Episcopal priest who is addicted to narcotic painkillers while his wife Judith (Susanna Thompson) fights her dependence on mid-day martinis.

Struggling to be a good husband, father, and priest, Webster regularly sees and talks with a traditional Western-world, white-skinned, white-robed and bearded Jesus (Garret Dillahunt) who nonetheless is rather unconventional. Daniel's Jesus appears only to him and openly questions modern interpretations of Church teachings, reminding Daniel of his own strengths and weaknesses.

The Webster family includes 23-year-old gay son Peter (Christian Campbell), 16-year-old daughter Grace (Alison Pill) (arrested for drug possession in the pilot episode), and 16-year-old adopted Chinese son Adam (Ivan Shaw), who is dating Caroline Paxton (Leven Rambin), the daughter of one of Daniel's parishioners who harbors anti-Asian prejudices. Another son, Peter's twin brother Jimmy, died of leukemia two years prior to the beginning of the series; Christian Campbell also played the role of Jimmy in flashback scenes in an unaired episode (which was included in the DVD release).

When Daniel's brother-in-law Charlie absconds with church funds and abandons his family, Daniel's sister-in-law (Cheryl White) enters a lesbian relationship with Charlie's bisexual secretary. Bishop Beatrice Congreve (Ellen Burstyn) is involved with Daniel's married father (James Rebhorn), a retired bishop who, despite his gruff exterior, is troubled by dealing with his wife's Alzheimer's disease.

Cast
Aidan Quinn as Daniel Webster
Susanna Thompson as Judith Webster
Ivan Shaw as Adam Webster 
Garret Dillahunt as Jesus
Alison Pill as Grace Webster
Christian Campbell as Peter Webster
Ellen Burstyn as Beatrice Congreve
James Rebhorn as Bertram Webster
Dylan Baker as Roger Northrup

Episodes

Controversy
The New York Times reported NBC had difficulty selling advertising during the program, even after offering significant rate discounts, because of controversial content.

Stations refuse to air
Eight of NBC's 232 affiliates refused to carry the program due to viewer complaints: WSMV in Nashville, Tennessee (owned by the Meredith Corporation); WGBC in Meridian, Mississippi; WTVA in Tupelo, Mississippi, and six stations owned by Nexstar Broadcasting Group – WTWO in Terre Haute, Indiana; KARK-TV in Little Rock, Arkansas; KFTA-TV/KNWA-TV in Fayetteville-Fort Smith, Arkansas (the former is now affiliated with Fox); KAMR in Amarillo, Texas and KBTV-TV in Beaumont, Texas (owned at the time by Nexstar). Most of the affiliates refusing to air the program were located in the Bible Belt.

After KARK-TV refused to air the series, KWBF (now MyNetworkTV affiliate KARZ-TV), then an affiliate of The WB, picked up the series. The company stated that it was excited to offer an outlet for viewers in the central Arkansas area who wanted to watch the show. However, the station soon received a number of threats, which required it to hire extra security. Both KARK-TV and KARZ have been owned by Nexstar since 2009, some three years after the show's cancellation.

Unconnected to the controversy, stations in Michigan, including WDIV in Detroit (owned by Post-Newsweek), WOOD-TV in Grand Rapids (owned at the time by LIN), WILX in Lansing (owned by Gray Television) and stations WPBN and WTOM in Traverse City and Sault Ste. Marie (owned at the time by Barrington Broadcasting), and WLUC in Marquette did not air the series's second episode. This was because of the traditional televised charity preview of that year's North American International Auto Show originated by WDIV; most of those stations carried it in off-peak timeslots elsewhere during the week.

NBC's Salt Lake City affiliate, KSL-TV (whose owner, Bonneville International, is operated by the Church of Jesus Christ of Latter-day Saints), did carry The Book of Daniel, despite the station's history of preempting shows claiming that they would offend Utah's religious population.

Mid-season cancellation
On January 24, 2006, NBC announced the show had been dropped from the schedule. The last airing of the show was on January 20, 2006. The January 20 episode was the fourth in the series, drawing 5.8 million viewers. NBC gave no official explanation for the cancellation.

DVD release
On September 26, 2006, a complete-series collection of The Book of Daniel was released on DVD exclusively on Amazon.com. The set includes two discs, featuring all eight episodes.

References

External links
 

NBC original programming
2000s American drama television series
2006 American television series debuts
2006 American television series endings
2000s American LGBT-related drama television series
Christian drama television series
Religious controversies in television
Religious controversies in the United States
Television controversies in the United States
Television series by Sony Pictures Television
Television series by Universal Television
Television shows set in New York (state)